CH-7 may refer to:
Japanese submarine chaser CH-7 (1938), Imperial Japanese Navy warship
Heli-Sport CH-7, ultralight, kit-built helicopter
 CH-7 (UAV), a stealthy flying wing UCAV